The 1892 Chicago Maroons football team represented the University of Chicago during the 1892 college football season. The University of Chicago opened its doors for its first semester on October 1, 1892, and the football team, led by Amos Alonzo Stagg as both player and coach, played its first game one week later on October 8, 1892.  In its first year of intercollegiate football, the Chicago team compiled an 8–4–1 record. The 1892 season included four victories over local high school teams, two victories over a local YMCA team, and seven intercollegiate games. In intercollegiate play, the team compiled a 2–4–1 record.

Schedule

Season summary

Pre-season

By April 1892, Amos Alonzo Stagg, a 30-year-old who had graduated from Yale University in 1888, had been hired to serve as an instructor and the head of the department of physical culture at the University of Chicago upon its opening in October 1892.

On October 1, 1892, the University of Chicago opened its doors for its first semester. At 2:30 p.m. that day, at the university chapel, Prof. Stagg from the department of physical culture called to order a meeting of 600 incoming students for the purpose of adopting a "college yell". After an hour of experimenting with yells, Stagg selected a number of students to form the university's first football team.  Stagg took the chosen students to Washington Park for preliminary football practice.  Stagg later recalled that he began with "about a dozen" inexperienced players.  Because of the lack of student participation during the 1892 season, Stagg decided to participate as a player.  He later recalled: "I had to do one-half the playing. Our boys are so very green."

Game 1: Hyde Park High School
On Saturday, October 8, 1892, Chicago played its first football game, defeating the team from Hyde Park High School by a 14–0 score at Washington Park. The lineup for Chicago consisted of Rapp, Stagg, Dyas, Hanson, Chase, Wyant, Smith, Loeb, Olson, Knapp, and Lamay.

Game 2: Englewood High School
On Monday, October 10, 1892, Chicago played its second football game, defeating the team from Englewood High School by a 12–8 score.  Nearly 1,000 spectators watch the game at Washington Park.  In its account of the game, the Chicago Daily Tribune credited Knapp (a former Wisconsin football player), Wyant, Olson, Chase and Stagg for their "splendid work".

Game 7: Northwestern
On October 22, 1892, Chicago played its first intercollegiate football game, playing a scoreless tie with Northwestern.  The game was played starting at 3:30 p.m. before 300 students at the South Side Ball Park.  In the second half, Stagg had a long run for a touchdown, but the referee ruled that "the ball had not touched the third man," and the touchdown did not count.  Chicago's lineup in the game was Rulkoetter (center), Smith (left guard), Knapp (right guard), Brenneman (left tackle), Wyant (right tackle), Allen (left end), Chase (right end), Raycrof (quarterback), McGillorey (left halfback), Stagg (right halfback), and Rapp (fullback).

Game 8: at Northwestern
On November 2, 1892, Chicago sustained its first loss, falling to Northwestern by a 6 to 4 score in a game played at Evanston, Illinois.  The game began at 3:50 p.m. and was played in the rain. In the first half, Kennicott scored a touchdown on a long run and then kicked for the goal after touchdown to give Northwestern a 6 to 0 lead.  In the second half, Chicago scored a touchdown, but Stagg's kick for the goal after touchdown was wide to the left.

Game 9: Lake Forest
On November 5, 1892, Chicago secured its first victory in an intercollegiate football game, defeating the team from Lake Forest College by an 18–16 score.  The game began at 3:30 p.m. and was played at the South Side grounds.  The Chicago Daily Tribune reported that Chicago's captain, Stagg, "played a game of strategy like the wizard he is." Chicago's second touchdown was scored on a trick play.  The ball was passed to Stagg who ran to the left and then passed to a teammate running in the opposite direction who ran through a clear field for a touchdown.  The Chicago Daily Tribune called it "one of those surprising plays that causes the onlooker to wonder why it was not done oftener."

Game 10: vs. Michigan
On November 13, 1892, Chicago played Michigan in the first chapter of what became the Chicago–Michigan football rivalry. The game was played on a wet and muddy field in front of a crowd estimated by various accounts at between 700 and 1,500 spectators at Toledo's Olympic Park. For Stagg, the game presented an opportunity to play the best football team in the West, and for the University of Chicago's president William Rainey Harper, it was "an opportunity to advertise the university in northern Ohio."  Michigan won the inaugural match by a score of 18 to 10.  Amos Alonzo Stagg was both the coach and starting right halfback for the 1892 Chicago Maroons. Chicago's full starting lineup was Conover (left end), Brenneman (left tackle), Smith (left guard), Rulkoelter (center), Knapp (right guard), Allen (right tackle), Chase (right end), Raycroft (quarterback), McGillivray (left halfback), Stagg (right halfback), Rapp (fullback).

Game 11: Illinois
On Wednesday, November 16, 1892, Chicago defeated Illinois by a 10–4 score in Chicago. Each team scored a touchdown but missed the goal after touchdown, and the first half ended in a 4–4 tie.  In the second half, Stagg ran around the left end for a touchdown and kicked the goal after touchdown to give Chicago its 10–4 advantage.  Illinois protested the legitimacy of Chicago's second touchdown and contended the game had rightfully ended in a tie. Chicago's lineup was Allen (left end), Brunerman (left tackle), Knapp (left guard), Rulkoetter (center), Smith (right guard), Wyant (right tackle), Chase (right end), Raycroft (quarterback), McGillivray (left halfback), Stagg (right halfback), and Rapp (fullback).

Game 12: at Purdue
On November 19, 1892, Chicago lost to Purdue by a 38–0 in a game played on Stuart Fieldl in West Lafayette, Indiana. Left tackle Finney scored five touchdowns for Purdue.  Chicago's starting lineup against Purdue was Conover (left end), Brenman (left tackle), Knapp (left guard), Ruelkoepper (center), Smith (right guard), Allen (right tackle), Chase (right end), Raycroft (quarterback), Stagg (right halfback), McGillivray (left halfback), and Rapp (fullback).

Game 13: at Illinois
On November 24, 1892, Chicago played in its first Thanksgiving Day game, losing to Illinois by a 28–12 score in Champaign, Illinois.  Stagg was unable to play in the game due to injury. Chicago's lineup against Illinois was O'Conner (left end), Breman (left tackle), Smith (left guard), Pullkaetter (center), Knapp (right guard), Wyant (right tackle), Chase (right end), Raycroft (quarterback), McGillivrey (halfback), Allen (halfback), Rapp (fullback).

Players

 Charles William Allen - right tackle, left end, halfback
 Richard E. Brendeman - left tackle
 Henry Thurston Chase - right end
 W. B. Conover - left end
 John V. Fradenburg
 Henry Gordon Gale
 George Knapp - right guard
 John Lemay
 Clifford B. McGillivray - left halfback
 William John Rapp - fullback
 Joseph Raycroft - quarterback
 W. Ruhlkoetter - center
 William Rufus Smith - guard
 Amos Alonzo Stagg - right halfback (College Football Hall of Fame)
 Andy Wyant - right tackle; a football player at Bucknell before playing for Stagg at Chicago (College Football Hall of Fame)

References

Chicago
Chicago Maroons football seasons
Chicago Maroons football